Dulce Canela (born July 25, 1995, in Monterrey, Nuevo León) is a Mexican professional wrestler currently working with Lucha Libre AAA Worldwide (AAA). Canela wrestles as an exótico character.

Professional wrestling career 
Canela has wrestled since at least 2011, early on mostly in Monterrey in arenas such as Arena Coliseo Monterrey and Arena El Jaguar as well as in other cities of northeastern Mexico.

On June 14 2020, Canela won the Women's Championship of Monterrey-based promotion Kaoz Lucha Libre. Canela held the title for almost two years but dropped it to Reina Dorada at a International Wrestling Revolution Group event June 2nd, 2022.

Lucha Libre AAA Worldwide 
Dulce Canela made his first appearance for AAA at a TV-taping in Veracruz November 30, 2019. The next day, he would be part of a 4-way Tag Team match at Triplemanía Regia. 

He would return to AAA in the summer of 2021 and has been appearing regularly on TV-tapings since. He worked the Copa Triplemania cibernetico matches at the Triplemanía XXX events in Tijuana and in Monterrey. 

Since July 2022, Canela has been part of the Las Shotas stable, an all exótico group with Jessy, Mamba and La Diva Salvaje.

Personal life 
Canela is openly homosexual, and claims that self defence training was the start of his love for combat sports and later professional wrestling.

References 

1995 births
Living people
Mexican male professional wrestlers
Professional wrestlers from Nuevo León
Unidentified wrestlers
People from Monterrey
21st-century professional wrestlers